Deadline at Eleven is a lost 1920 American silent drama film directed by George Fawcett and starring Corinne Griffith. It was produced by and distributed by the Vitagraph Company of America.

Cast

References

External links

1920 films
American silent feature films
Lost American films
Vitagraph Studios films
American black-and-white films
Silent American drama films
1920 drama films
1920 lost films
Lost drama films
1920s American films